Odense Sports Park is a sports complex located in Odense, Denmark. The complex belongs to Municipality of Odense and contains various sports venues including the Odense Stadion. It also has seven swimming pools open for public use.

Sports venues
 Odense Stadion, home ground for Odense Boldklub, currently known as EWII Park
 Odense Athletic Stadium 
 Odense Cricket Stadium
 Odense Ice Stadium
 Odense Gymnastic Hall 
 Sydbank Arena Odense, home to the handball team Odense Håndbold
 Thorvald Ellegaard Arena, a velodrome and indoor athletics arena, named after Danish cyclist Thorvald Ellegaard.

References

Sports venues in Denmark
Athletics (track and field) venues in Denmark
Buildings and structures in Odense
Cricket grounds in Denmark
Velodromes in Denmark
Gymnastics venues